Shree Rajrajeshwari Maa Mahamaya Devi Mandir Raipur or popularly Mahamaya Temple is a Hindu Temple dedicated to Devi Mahamaya located at Purani Basti, Raipur, Chhattisgarh. It is one of the 36 Shaktipeeths or 36 forts of Chhattisgarh. Built between 17th-18th Century by Maratha Ruler Mordhwaj, it is one of the oldest and the richest temple of Raipur. There two temple in temple, Mahamaya Mandir and Samaleswari Mandir. During sunset, Sun rays touches the feet of Maa Mahamaya and during sunrise, rays touches feet of Maa Samaleswari.

History 
Mahamaya Temple is almost 1400 years old. According to historical evidence, the Haihaya kings built thirty-six forts in Chhattisgarh and built temples of Maa Mahamaya at the beginning of each fort and the temple is one of there forts. Presently, there is no evidence of fort but temple dedicated to Mahamaya and Samaleswari. This temple was built by King Mordhwaj of Haihaya by Tantrik Vidhi which make it a pilgrimage for Aghoris & Tantriks. Present Temple was renovated by Marathas of Nagpur.

Story 
Once King Mordhwaj went on a tour of his kingdom with his queen Kumuddhati Devi. When they were returning, it was early morning.  King Mordhwaj was on the other side of the river Karun, while crossing the river a thought came to mind that after retiring from the morning routine, travel ahead.  Thinking of this, they put their halts on the river bank (present Mahadevghat).  The maidservants started taking the queen towards the river to take a bath by wearing a cloth veil.  As soon as the river reached near, the queen and her maids saw that a huge rock was lying in the water and three giant snakes were sitting with their hoods spread from three sides.  Seeing this scene they all got scared and screamed and returned to the halt.  All the news was sent to the king. As soon as the news was received, the king immediately came to that place. When he also saw this scene, he was surprised. Immediately called his Raj Jyotishi and Rajpurohit.  He also saw and meditated and told the king that Rajan, this is not a stone but an idol of the goddess and is lying upside down.  On the advice given by him, King Mordhwaj worshiped methodically after bathing and slowly started moving towards the rock.  Three giant snakes started sliding from there one by one.  After they left, the king touched that rock and bowed down and got it straightened. Everyone was astonished to see that she stood not on a rock but on a lion and that Mahishasuramardini is an idol of the octagonal goddess Bhagwati. Seeing this, everyone bowed with folded hands. At that time a voice came out of the idol, "O Rajan!  I am your Kuldevi. You worship me and honor me, I myself Mahamaya." The king consulted his pandits, acharyas and astrologers and took advice. Everyone advised that the life of Bhagwati Maa Mahamaya should be consecrated, only then it was learned that a new temple has been constructed in the present old township area for some other deity.  After completing the construction work in the same temple according to the order of the goddess, the life of Adishakti Maa Mahamaya was consecrated by bringing it from Kharun river completely by Vedic and Tantric method.  Let us tell you that the idol of the Goddess installed in the temple is visible from outside.  But as soon as one enters the temple, the idol starts looking straight.

Gallery

References

Hindu temples in Chhattisgarh
Tourist attractions in Chhattisgarh
Shakti temples